"That's What I Think" is a song by American singer and songwriter Cyndi Lauper, released in November 1993 as the second single from her fourth album, Hat Full of Stars (1993). Produced by Lauper and Junior Vasquez, the song peaked in the top 40 in a couple of countries and was a dance hit in the United States. Its popular remixes caused the track to climb on the dance charts. It appeared on the album Twelve Deadly Cyns...and Then Some in its album edit format. Upon the release, Lauper performed it at the American Music Awards, The Late Show with David Letterman, The Arsenio Hall Show, and The Tonight Show.

Tommy Page covered the song on his 1996 album Loving You.

Critical reception
Mike DeGagne from AllMusic felt that songs like "That's What I Think" "make for the most promising" of the 11 cuts on the Hat Full of Stars album. Larry Flick from Billboard wrote, "With this funk-injected pop shuffler, Lauper offers what may be her most accessible and charming single in a long time." He added, "A husky vocal is framed by wriggling guitars and flourishing horns, seeping into a neat, muscular bassline. And the cute chorus is a fun sing-along." The Daily Vault's Mark Millan called it as a very good song and a "blunt social commentary if ever there was one". In his weekly UK chart commentary, James Masterton complimented it as a "cleverly constructed track". Holly George Warren of Rolling Stone noted Lauper's "throaty belting".

Music video
A music video was produced to promote the single, directed by Cyndi Lauper herself. It features different fans explaining what music meant to them. The video was later published on YouTube in October 2009. It has amassed more than 700,000 views as of September 2021.

Track listings

 US CD single
 "That's What I Think" (Album Edit) – 4:17
 "That's What I Think" (Live Version) – 4:35
 "That's What I Think" (Slugger Mix) – 6:09
 "That's What I Think" (Deep Mix) – 5:26
 "That's What I Think" (Musto Club Mix) – 7:07

 UK CD1
 "That's What I Think" (Single Version) – 4:17
 "That's What I Think" (Live Version) – 4:35
 "That's What I Think" (Musto Club Mix) – 7:10
 "That's What I Think" (Vasquez Club Mix) – 5:31
 "That's What I Think" (Musto Dub Mix) – 7:22
 "That's What I Think" (Vasquez Club Dub) – 5:26

 UK CD2 (limited-edition)
 "That's What I Think" (Album Version) – 4:38
 "I Drove All Night" – 4:08
 "True Colors" – 3:46
 "Girls Just Want to Have Fun" – 3:55

 Europe 2-track CD single, 7-inch, and cassette
 "That's What I Think" (Album Edit) – 4:17
 "That's What I Think" (Live Version) – 4:35

 Europe CD maxi-single
 "That's What I Think" (Album Edit) – 4:17
 "That's What I Think" (Live Version) – 4:35
 "That's What I Think" (Musto Remix) – 3:41

 US 12-inch
A1: "That's What I Think" (Musto Club Mix) – 7:10
A2: "That's What I Think" (Musto Dub Mix) – 7:22
A3: "That's What I Think" (Musto Radio Mix) – 3:55
B1: "That's What I Think" (Vasquez Club Mix) – 5:31
B2: "That's What I Think" (Vasquez Deep Mix) – 5:18
B3: "That's What I Think" (Vasquez Factory Mix) – 5:24

 Europe 12-inch
A1: "That's What I Think" (Musto Club Mix) – 7:10
A2: "That's What I Think" (Musto Dub Mix) – 7:22
A3: "That's What I Think" (Musto Tribal Mix) – 3:05
B1: "That's What I Think" (Vasquez Club Mix) – 5:31
B2: "That's What I Think" (Vasquez Club Dub) – 5:26
B3: "That's What I Think" (Vasquez Urban Dance Mix) – 6:03
B4: "That's What I Think" (Vasquez Tribal Mix) – 5:22

Charts

References

Cyndi Lauper songs
1993 singles
1993 songs
Epic Records singles
Songs written by Allee Willis
Songs written by Cyndi Lauper
Songs written by Eric Bazilian
Songs written by Rob Hyman